Ramecourt is a commune in the Vosges department in Grand Est in northeastern France.

Inhabitants are called Ramecurtiens.

Geography
The village enjoys the soothing presence of the little stream that flows along the Arol Valley (Val d’Arol). The proximity of several thermal resorts, the sunlit mountains, and the trout fishing available in the stream make the village one that welcomes visitors. The picturesque orchards, pastureland and hedges that surround the village reflect the nature of the local agriculture.

Victor Hugo
The deaths of Jean Hugo and of his wife, Catherine Mansuy, paternal great-great-grandparents to Victor Hugo, are mentioned in the parish register of the adjacent commune of Domvallier as having occurred respectively in November and December 1731.   Jean had been born at Vaudémont in 1648, and that is where he married his wife in 1673, but around 1700 they came to live at Ramecourt.   Their children included Jean Philippe Hugo, apparently married to another Catherine.   These produced Joseph Hugo 1727 - 1799, grandfather to the famous writer.

There had been a Hugo family in Ramecourt earlier.   On 20 August 1631 Claudon Hugo, known according to one source as 'The Hollander', signed a contract with the town of Mirecourt for the burial of plague victims.   At the date of the contract he was residing with his uncle François Hugo of Ramecourt.   Claudon Hugo was for many years believed to be a direct ancestor of Victor Hugo:  it is now thought that the shared kinship of these two was less direct, however.

See also
Communes of the Vosges department

References

Communes of Vosges (department)